The Hailiang Group is a Chinese private company active in non-ferrous metals (particularly copper), construction, ecological agriculture, environmental protection, private education and finance industries.

Hailiang (meaning "Sea Light") was founded in 1989 in Zhuji as a small copper plant. 

Hailiang was ranked 459th in the Fortune Global 500 for 2021. In a list of China's top 500 enterprises, it was ranked 16th.

Its private education firm (Hailiang Education Group Inc.) is traded on the Nasdaq (stock code HLG).

References

External links
 

Chinese companies established in 1989
Companies based in Hangzhou
Metal companies of China
Construction and civil engineering companies of China
Private education in China